Dolichopus crenatus is a species of long-legged fly in the family Dolichopodidae.

References

crenatus
Articles created by Qbugbot
Taxa named by Carl Robert Osten-Sacken
Insects described in 1877